Federal State Unitary Enterprise "Publishing and Trading Center " Marka " provides publishing and distribution of postage stamps - stamps, booklets, ASE, marked cards, wire forms, FDC and special cancellation postmarks. The range of products also includes postcards and philatelic collections.

History 
History of Publishing and Trade Center "Marka" begins with 1857, when at the main post office was founded Branded expedition and issued a circular Postal Department "On the introduction of postage stamps for public use", but then in December 1857, and in some provinces went on sale first grade . On January 1, 1858 began their official application for payment of simple written correspondence on the territory of Russia.

Description 
Publishing and Trading Centre "Marka" provides the population of Russia the state signs of postal payment, ASE and cards, various kinds of philatelic products. The company also manufactures special postage stamp that has the original exterior design: drawing and additional memorable text. Products Izdattsentra "Marka" reflects the multi-ethnic state system of the Russian Federation, the cultural and historical heritage of the peoples living on its territory, the main events of the internal and international life, human achievement in all fields of knowledge, rich flora and fauna of Russia.

Distribution of philatelic products 
Philatelic products are distributed through post offices and philatelic specialty stores across the country.

References 
  Источник: Альманах «Золотая книга России, год 2002, том II», 2002, АСМО-пресс.
  Новостная заметка Агентства экономической информации ПРАЙМ-ТАСС.

Philately of Russia
Federal State Unitary Enterprises of Russia
Companies based in Moscow